Jean Pierre Bernard Édouard Filhol (7 October 1814 – 25 June 1883) was a French scientist.

In 1854 Édouard Filhol was appointed Professor of Chemistry at the University of Toulouse, a position he held until 1882. Later, in 1865, he became director of the Museum de Toulouse. It was the first museum in the world to open a gallery of prehistory thanks to the collaboration of Emile Cartailhac, Jean-Baptiste Noulet and Eugène Trutat. In the same year, he  became  director of the School of Medicine and Pharmacy at the University of Toulouse.

Jean-Baptiste Senderens studied under Édouard Filhol, professor of Chemistry at the Faculty of Sciences in Toulouse.
After ten years of collaboration with Filhol he began a collaboration of equal length with Paul Sabatier, Filhol's successor.

From 1867–1870, Édouard Filhol was Mayor of Toulouse.

He was  the father of  the naturalist Henri Filhol (1843–1902)

References

John M. Burney, 1988 Toulouse et son université. Facultés et étudiants dans la France provinciale du XIXe siècle, par John M. Burney, aux Presses universitaires du Mirail et Éditions du CNRS

Sources

Prehistorians
19th-century French chemists
1814 births
1883 deaths